Berytus (Arabic: بِيرِيتُوس), briefly known as Laodicea in Phoenicia or Laodicea in Canaan from the 2nd century to 64 BCE, was the ancient city of Beirut (in modern-day Lebanon) from the Roman Republic through the Roman Empire and Early Byzantine period/late antiquity.  Berytus became a Roman colonia that would be the center of Roman presence in the eastern Mediterranean shores south of Anatolia. The veterans of two Roman legions under Augustus were established in the city (the fifth Macedonian and the third Gallic), that afterward quickly became Romanized and was the only fully Latin-speaking city in the Syria-Phoenicia region until the fourth century. Although Berytus was still an important city after earthquakes, around 400 CE Tyre was made the capital of the Roman province of Phoenicia. "Of the great law schools of Rome, Constantinople, and Berytus", the law school of Berytus stood "pre-eminent". The Code of Justinian (one part of the Corpus Juris Civilis, the codification of Roman law ordered early in the 6th century CE by Justinian I and fully written in Latin) was mostly created in this school.

History

Early history
In 140 BCE the Phoenician village called "Biruta" was destroyed by Diodotus Tryphon in his contest with Antiochus VII Sidetes for the throne of the Macedonian Seleucid monarchy. Later it was rebuilt on a more conventional Hellenistic plan—the exact date is unclear but prosperous Berytian merchants were recorded in Delos by 110–109 BCE—under the name of Laodicea in Phoenicia or Laodicea in Canaan in honor of a Seleucid Laodice.

During the late decades of the Roman Republic the city was conquered by the Romans of Pompey in 64 BCE and renamed "Berytus", as a reference to the name of the old original Phoenician port-village. The city was assimilated into the Roman Empire, many veteran soldiers were sent there, and large building projects were undertaken.

Roman colonia

In 14 BCE, during the reign of Herod the Great, Berytus became an important Roman colonia. The city was named Colonia Iulia Augusta Felix Berytus in honor of Julia, the only daughter of Augustus (according to Theodore Mommsen, Res gestae divi Augusti, II, 119). The veterans of two Roman legions were established in the city of Berytus by emperor Augustus: the fifth Macedonian and the third Gallic. The city quickly became Romanized, with two third of the inhabitants being descendants of the Roman veterans. Large public buildings and monuments were erected and Berytus enjoyed full status as a part of the empire.

Berytus was considered the most Roman city in the eastern provinces of the Roman Empire. It was one of four Roman colonies in the Syria-Phoenicia region and the only one with full Ius Italicum (meaning: exemption from imperial taxation).
 

Its territory/district under Claudius reached the Bekaa valley and included Heliopolis; it was the only area mostly Latin-speaking in the Syria-Phoenicia region, because of the Roman colonists who promoted agriculture in the fertile lands around Yammoune. From the 1st century BCE the Bekaa valley served as a source of grain for the Roman provinces of the Levant and even for the same Rome (today the valley makes up to 40 percent of Lebanon's arable land): Roman colonists created there even a "country district" called Pagus Augustus, where are located the famous Niha temples with Latin inscriptions.

Agrippa greatly favoured the city of Berytus, and adorned it with a splendid theatre and amphitheatre, beside baths and porticoes, inaugurating them with games and spectacles of every kind, including shows of gladiators. Now only minor ruins remain, in front of the Catholic Cathedral of Beirut. Four large bath complexes as well as numerous private baths increased the city's water consumption: the Romans constructed an aqueduct fed by the Beirut River whose main source was 10 km from the city. The aqueduct crossed the river at Qanater Zbaydeh and the water finally reached Riad Al Solh Square; there, at the foot of the Serail Hill, it was stored in large cisterns. An intricate network of lead or clay pipes and channels distributed the water to the various pools of the Roman Baths.

Roman Berytus was a city of nearly 50,000 inhabitants during the reign of Trajan and had a huge forum and necropolis. The Hippodrome of Berytus was the largest known in the Levant, while literary sources indicate there was a theatre. Scholars like Linda Hall write that the hippodrome was still working in the fifth century.

Berytus had a monumental "Roman Gate" with huge walls (recently discovered) and was a trade center of silk and wine production, well connected by efficient Roman roads to Heliopolis and Caesarea. According to Kevin Butcher, the Latin character of Berytus remained dominant until the fifth century: the city was a center for the study of Latin literature and – after Septimius Severus – of Roman Law. Under Nero the son of a Roman colonist, Marcus Valerius Probus (born in Berytus around CE 25), was known in all the empire as a Latin grammarian and literature master philologist.

Roman emperors promoted the development of high-level culture in the fully Romanized city (even in Greek language as with Hermippus of Berytus).

The Law School of Berytus
The Berytian law school was widely known in the Roman Empire;: it was famous the Latin motto Berytus Nutrix Legum ("Beirut, Mother of Laws"). Indeed, two of Rome's most famous jurists, Papinian and Ulpian, both natives of Phoenicia, taught there under the Severan emperors.

When Justinian assembled his Pandects in the sixth century, a large part of the "Corpus of Laws" -all in Latin- was derived from these two jurists, and in 533 CE Justinian recognized the school as one of the three official law schools of the empire. 

The law school of Beirut supplied the Roman Empire, especially its eastern provinces, with lawyers and magistrates for three centuries until the school's destruction in a powerful earthquake.
After the 551 Beirut earthquake the students were transferred to Sidon.

Early Byzantine rule
Under the Eastern Roman Empire, some intellectual and economic activities in Berytus continued to flourish for more than a century, even if the Latin language started to be replaced by the Greek language and become Hellenised again.

However, in the sixth century a series of earthquakes demolished most of the temples of Heliopolis (actual Baalbek) and destroyed the city of Berytus, leveling its famous law school and killing nearly 30,000 inhabitants (according to Anonymous pilgrim of Piacenza). Furthermore, the ecumenical Christian councils of the fifth and sixth centuries CE were unsuccessful in settling religious disagreements within the surviving community.

This turbulent Byzantine period weakened the already Hellenised (and fully Christian) population and made it easy prey to the newly converted Muslim Arabs of the Arabian Peninsula. Eastern Roman Berytus -reduced to the size of a village- fell to the Arabs in 635 CE.

Recent discoveries

Recently at the Garden of Forgiveness the two main streets of Roman Berytus, the cardo and decumanus, were discovered in the Beirut Central District. Their shaded colonnades became busy markets on festival days. At other times, these  streets would have been frequented by Law School students and citizens passing to the Forum or visiting temples and churches.

In 1968 were discovered the "Roman Baths" Gardens, a landscaped public space that lies on the eastern slope of the Serail Hill. It consists of a garden and a set of uncovered ruins of the ancient Roman Baths (hence the name of the place). These ruins underwent a thorough cleaning and further excavation in 1995–1997. Designed by the British landscaping firm Gillespies, the Gardens' layout is dominated by low-slung glass walls and lookout platforms that can be turned into concert venues, thus giving a 21st-century touch without harming the area's historical fabric.

At the turn of the 20th century, the area where existed the famous school of Roman law at Berytus was identified. Archaeological excavations in the area between the Saint George Greek Orthodox Cathedral and Saint George Cathedral of the Maronites unearthed a funerary stele etched with an epitaph to a man named Patricius, "whose career was consecrated for the study of law". The epitaph was identified as being dedicated to the famous 5th-century law school professor. In the 5th century, Zacharias Rhetor reported that the school stood next to the "Temple of God", the description of which permitted its identification with the Byzantine Anastasis cathedral.

Notable people
 Hermippus of Berytus (fl. 2nd century CE)
 Marcus Valerius Probus (c. 20/30 – 105 CE)
 Vindonius Anatolius
 Eudokia of Heliopolis

See also
 Cisterns of the Roman Baths, Beirut
 Phoenicia under Roman rule
 Augusti Pagus

Notes

Bibliography

Lauffray,Jean. Beyrouth, Archéologie et Histoire I : période hellénistique et Haut-Empire romain, in "Aufstieg und Niedergang des römischen Welt", vol. II, 8, New York-Berlin, 1977, p. 135-163.
Mann, J.C. The settlement of veterans in the Roman Empire London University. London, 1956
Mommsen, Theodore. The Provinces of the Roman Empire from Caesar to Diocletian. Press Holdings International. New York, 2004. 
Mouterde, René et Lauffray, Jean (1952) Beyrouth ville romaine. Publications de la Direction des Antiquités du Liban, Beyrouth.

Archaeological sites in Lebanon
Beirut
Coloniae (Roman)
History of Beirut
Seleucid colonies
Razed cities
Roman sites in Lebanon